The Bentley State Limousines are official state cars manufactured by Bentley as a gift for the late Queen Elizabeth II on the occasion of her Golden Jubilee in 2002. The two cars produced were in service for the Queen up until her death in 2022. They have most  recently been in service for King Charles III. The Princess Royal used the car while accompanying the Queen's coffin. Both cars are kept in the Royal Mews.

Description

The State Limousines are  longer than a standard Bentley Arnage,  taller, and  wider. They are equipped with broad coach doors opening to the rear by almost 90 degrees. Opaque panels over the rear window of the cars can either be installed for added privacy or removed for added visibility of the occupants.  For protection of the occupants, the bodywork and glass are armoured, the cabin can be sealed air-tight in case of gas attack and is also blast-resistant, and the tyres are kevlar-reinforced.

 

The Bentleys are used mostly on official engagements, and are always escorted by a selection of marked and unmarked Royal Protection Squad vehicles and local police vehicles and motorcycle outriders. The motorcade usually includes a support vehicle to carry staff and aides, which was previously a silver VW Transporter minibus, until replaced by a black Mercedes V-Class in 2019. Both minibuses used the registration plate 1 KUV.

The Queen also used the Bentleys to travel to and from Crathie Kirk when at Balmoral, and Sandringham House. Up until her death in 2022, she typically used the Bentleys on the rare occasions that she travelled abroad, but also used other state cars or a vehicle provided by her hosts.

Like all British state cars, the Bentleys have a mount on the roof for an illuminated coat-of-arms and a pennant, which can be inserted from inside the vehicle. These usually feature the royal coat-of-arms and the Royal Standard respectively, although other symbols can be used for occasions such as a state visit. When carrying the Queen the Bentley "Flying B" bonnet ornament was replaced, either by the Queen's personal mascot of Saint George slaying the dragon made by the artist Edward Seago, or, in Scotland, by a single standing lion. The Bentleys are equipped with flashing blue lights, two within the radiator grille and two mounted on the front bumper. The State Limousines neither have nor require number plates. The Bentleys are painted claret and black, in keeping with all British state vehicles.

In January 2009, it was announced that the Bentley State Limousines would both be converted to run on biofuel.

The vehicle was showcased at the 2013 Coronation Festival in Buckingham Palace Gardens.

The two limousines are said to be valued at £10 million each.

Production
British textile manufacturer Hield Brothers produced the lambswool sateen cloth used for the upholstery of the rear seats.

The unique bodywork was built by Bentley's Mulliner coachbuilding division.

Only two of these vehicles were built, making it even rarer than the Rolls-Royce Phantom IV, of which just 18 were built for royalty and heads of state.

See also
 Prime Ministerial Car (United Kingdom)

References

External links

 Bentley State Limousine for H.M. The Queen
 The Queen arrives for a visit to Google's London HQ in the Bentley State Limousine

Golden Jubilee of Elizabeth II
State Limousine
Royal vehicles
Road transport of heads of state
Limousines
Individual cars